The Beijing X5 or previously the Senova X55 is a compact CUV positioned under the Senova X65 compact CUV produced by BAIC under the Senova (Shenbao 绅宝) and later the Beijing brand.

First generation (2015–2018)

Originally previewed by the Beijing Auto C51X SUV concept, the production version of the first generation Senova X55 debuted during the 2015 Shanghai Auto Show, and was launched on to the China car market by the end of 2015. 

The Senova X55 is powered by two Mitsubishi-sourced four-cylinder petrol engines. The engines offered are a 1.5-litre engine producing  and  mated to a 5-speed manual gearbox and a 1.5-litre turbo engine producing  mated to a six-speed manual gearbox or a CVT automatic gearbox. Prices starts from 76,800 yuan to 119,800 yuan.

Second generation  (2018–present)

The second generation Beijing Auto Senova X55 was unveiled on the 2017 Shanghai Auto Show in April 2017, with the market launch in July 2018. 

Unveiled in October 2018 with the Chinese name "Zhixing" (智行), the second generation Senova X55 also features the new "Offspace" design language which later becomes the design of Beijing branded vehicles.

The front suspension of the X55 is MacPherson-type independent suspension while the rear suspension is multi-link suspension. 

As of 2020, the second generation model was later renamed to Beijing X5 after the launch of the revamped Beijing brand.

BJEV EX5
The BJEV EX5 is a plug-in electric vehicle.  It is the "NEV" version of the Senova X55 for the Chinese market which has a number of special incentives for NEVs. The BJEV EX5 was launched in the market January 2019.

The BJEV EC5 is equipped with a  electric motor and a  battery.

References

External links 

 BAIC Official site
 Official Senova X55 Website

X55
Cars introduced in 2015
Compact sport utility vehicles
Front-wheel-drive vehicles
Crossover sport utility vehicles
Vehicles with CVT transmission
Cars of China
Production electric cars
BAIC Group vehicles